Kay Nunatak is a dark rocky nunatak rising to , situated at the south side of Mobiloil Inlet and forming the northernmost outlier of the Hitchcock Heights, on the east coast of the Antarctic Peninsula. The nunatak was photographed from the air by Sir Hubert Wilkins on December 20, 1928, and by Lincoln Ellsworth in 1935. It was named in 1952 by the Advisory Committee on Antarctic Names for John D. Kay of the American Geographical Society, who by utilizing these photographs assisted in constructing the first reconnaissance map of this area.

References

Nunataks of Graham Land
Bowman Coast